The mixed tandem event at the 2022 World Singles Ninepin Bowling Classic Championships was held in Elva, Estonia on 24-25 May 2022.

The world champions became the Croats Nataša Ravnić and Hrvoje Marinović. The silver medals went to Hungarians Edit Sass and Zoltán Móricz, while the bronzes were won by Austrians Fiona Steiner and Markus Vsetecka, and Croats Venesa Bogdanović and Alen Kujundžić.

Results

Starting places 
The starting places have been allocated on the basis of each nation achievements during the previous championships.

Draw 
The players were drawn into bouts with the reservation that competitors from the same country can not play in the first round against each other.<ref>

References 

2022
Mixed tandem